Waldeen (von) Falkenstein Brooke de Zatz better known as "Waldeen" (February 1, 1913August 18, 1993) was an American-born dancer and choreographer. Together with Anna Sokolow, Alicia Markova, Anton Dolin and Michel Descombey, she belongs to the great precursors of modern Mexican dance.

Biography 
Waldeen was born in Dallas. Her father, an engraver, and her mother, a pianist, greatly encouraged Waldeen to explore the arts from a young age. Due to this, among other influences, she developed a dream of becoming a ballet dancer, and said she never wanted to do anything else. She spent the better part of her youth training under Theodore Kosloff in Los Angeles, where he recognized her talent early and invited her to tour with his ballet company. Her first solo performance, done at age 13, was for the Los Angeles Opera Company. She joined the Japanese choreographer Seki Sano when he moved to Mexico. She taught and performed in Los Angeles in the early 1930s. She returned to Mexico with the dancer Winifred Widener to Mexico City in 1939, where they danced at the theater of fine arts. She was ordered to establish the Ballet de Bellas Artes, the ballet group of the theater, which she led until it was dissolved in 1947. At this time she had also an affair with Bodo Uhse and lived together with him, before he married Alma Agee.

Waldeen married Rodolfo Valencia, a theater director, and was invited by the revolutionary government of Cuba, where she stood from 1962 to 1965. In 1966 she established a further ballet company, known as the "Waldeen Ballet". Notable dancers of the company were Guillermina Bravo and Ana Mérida.

In 1988, she received the inaugural José Limón National Dance Award.

She died in Cuernavaca.

References

External links 
 
 Jonathan Cohen: Waldeen and the Americas: The Dance Has Many Faces
 
 Deborah Smith: Terpsichore's Daughter. Authorized biography of Waldeen.

American ballerinas
American choreographers
Mexican ballerinas
Mexican choreographers
Ballet choreographers
People from Dallas
1913 births
1993 deaths
20th-century American women
20th-century American ballet dancers
American emigrants to Mexico